Washington Hall was a red brick hotel designed by John McComb Jr.  and built from 1809 to 1812 on the site of the African Burial Ground. It was original owned by Dutch-American merchant John Gerard Coster, and had been a meeting place and headquarters for the Federalist Party. On September 20, 1824, it was the site of a banquet for the Marquis de Lafayette as part of his 1824-1825 tour of the United States. In 1835, it was the location of the first meeting of the Saint Nicholas Society, which was founded by Washington Irving. Washington Hall became less prominent during the mid-19th century, as the oyster bar in its basement became more important than the hotel itself. The hotel burned down in July 1844 and was replaced by the original section of the A.T. Stewart Dry Goods Store. That building still stands today on the site at 280 Broadway.

References

Defunct hotels in Manhattan